Streptomyces longispororuber is a bacterium species from the genus of Streptomyces. Streptomyces longispororuber produces corallomycin.

See also 
 List of Streptomyces species

References

Further reading

External links
Type strain of Streptomyces longispororuber at BacDive -  the Bacterial Diversity Metadatabase

longispororuber
Bacteria described in 1953